Kalupage Austin Fernando is a Sri Lankan civil servant and the current Sri Lankan High Commissioner to India. He had previously served as Secretary to the President of Sri Lanka, Defence Secretary and Governor of the Eastern Province.

Early life and education
Fernando was educated at Richmond College, Galle. After school he joined the University of Ceylon, Peradeniya from where he graduated with a B.A. degree. He later received a M.B.A. degree from the University of Sri Jayewardenepura.

Career
Fernando taught at Nagoda Royal National College for a period of time before joining the Sri Lanka Administrative Service (SLAS). He was Government Agent for Polonnaruwa District and Nuwara Eliya District. He was later Commissioner of Cooperative Development and Postmaster General. He was then secretary at Ministry of Rehabilitation and Ministry of Public Administration, Home Affairs and Provincial Councils. He was a consultant to the United Nations before being appointed Defence Secretary in December 2001.

Newly elected President Maithripala Sirisena appointed Fernando as a presidential adviser on 15 January 2015. He was thereafter appointed Governor of Eastern Province on 27 January 2015. He resigned in order to become Secretary to the President of Sri Lanka on 1 July 2017 which he held till 5 July 2018.

Writings
Fernando is the author of My Belly is White: Reminiscences of a Peacetime Secretary of Defence.

References

Alumni of Richmond College, Galle
Alumni of the University of Ceylon (Peradeniya)
Alumni of the University of Sri Jayewardenepura
Government Agents (Sri Lanka)
Governors of Eastern Province, Sri Lanka
High Commissioners of Sri Lanka to India
Living people
Permanent secretaries of Sri Lanka
Place of birth missing (living people)
Sinhalese civil servants
Sinhalese teachers
Year of birth missing (living people)